Go North may refer to:

Go North (film), 2017 thriller film
Go North (program), service provided by Nefesh B'Nefesh that encourages immigration to the northern part of Israel
"Go North", 1970 song by Richard Barnes
Welsh rugby union players switching code to rugby league